Phoebe C. Ellsworth is an American social psychologist and professor at the University of Michigan, holding dual appointments at the Psychology Department and in the Law School.

Biography
Ellsworth received her B.A. from Radcliffe College in 1966 and her Ph.D. in social psychology from Stanford University in 1970.

Ellsworth previously held positions at Yale University and Stanford University. Throughout her career, she has served on various editorial boards, advisory committees, and review panels. She also served as a member on the Board of Trustees of the Law and Society Association, the Executive Board of the Society for Experimental Social Psychology, and the Board of Trustees of the Russell Sage Foundation. She is currently a board member of the Death Penalty Information Center.

Ellsworth is noted for her work in law and psychology. More specifically, she has done research on jury behavior and decision making, public opinion and the death penalty, and eyewitness identification. Her other main research interest is in emotions. Some areas of research in this topic include facial emotions, cognition and emotion, and interpretation of emotion. As a graduate student, she worked with Paul Ekman and Wallace Friesen to develop the photographs that were used in their research comparing perceptions of emotional faces across cultures. Ellsworth is known for her contributions to appraisal theory, emotions and culture, challenges of emotion and language, and for her writing on William James. In much of her research, Ellsworth has intertwined an interest in cultural differences. In particular, she has taken a look at the cultural differences in perceiving facial emotions (Masuda, Ellsworth, Mesquita, Leu, Tanida, and Van de Veerdonk, 2008).

Ellsworth has received many honors in her career. She is a Frank Murphy Distinguished University Professor of Law and Psychology (2003), Fellow of the American Academy of Arts and Sciences, and Phi Beta Kappa Distinguished Lecturer (2002-2004). In addition, an annual symposium, Phoebe Ellsworth Psychology and Justice Symposium, was created in her honor to recognize her contributions to law and psychology. In 2014 she received both the Nalini Ambady Award for Mentoring Excellence and the Career Contribution Award from the Society for Personality and Social Psychology.

Recent publications

 
 
 "Social Science and the Evolving Standards of Death Penalty Law." S. R. Gross, co-author. In Beyond Common Sense, edited by E. Borgida and S. T. Fiske, 237-59. Malden, Mass.: Blackwell Publishing, 2008.
 "Legal Reasoning." In The Cambridge Handbook of Thinking and Reasoning, edited by K. J. Holyoak & R. G. Morrison Jr., 685-704. New York: Cambridge Univ. Press, 2005.
 "Clapping with Both Hands: Numbers, People, and Simultaneous Hypotheses." In Perspectivism in Social Psychology: The Yin and Yang of Scientific Progress, edited by John T. Jost et al., 261-73. APA Science Series; APA Decade of Behavior Series. Washington, D.C.: American Psychological Association, 2004.
 Ellsworth, P. C., & Gonzalez, R. (2003). Questions, comparisons, and preparation: Methods of research in social psychology. In M. Hogg & J. Cooper (Eds.), Sage Handbook of Social Psychology (pp 24–42). Thousand Oaks, CA: Sage Publications.
 Ellsworth and A. Reifman. Juror Comprehension and Public Policy: Perceived Problems and Proposed Solutions. 6 Psychol., Pub. Pol'y, & Law  788 (2000).
 Ellsworth, P. C., & Scherer, K. R. (2003). Appraisal processes in emotion. In R. J. Davidson, H. Goldsmith, & K. R. Scherer (Eds.), Handbook of Affective Sciences. New York and Oxford: Oxford University Press.
 Ellsworth & Samuel R. Sommers. How Much Do We Really Know About Race and Juries? A Review of Social Science Theory and Research.  78 Chi.-Kent L. Rev. 997 (2003).
 Ellsworth & Samuel R. Sommers. White Juror Bias: An Investigation of Prejudice Against Black Defendants in the American Courtroom. 8 Violence & Abuse Abstracts  3 (2002).
 Gross, S., & Ellsworth, P. C. (2003) Second thoughts: Americans; views on the death penalty. In S.P. Garvey (Ed.), Beyond repair? America's death penalty. Durham, NC: Duke University Press.

References

Sources
 
 http://cgi2.www.law.umich.edu/_FacultyBioPage/facultybiopagenew.asp?ID=137
 http://ellsworth.socialpsychology.org/
 http://www.lsa.umich.edu/psych/news/on-our-minds/2006/pdf/OOM2006_FINAL.pdf 
 (2006 University of Michigan Psychology Department newsletter, featuring an interview with Ellsworth)
 http://www.westernpsych.org/programs/program99/sat.html
 http://www.mtholyoke.edu/offices/comm/csj/042602/Ellsworth.shtml

American social psychologists
Radcliffe College alumni
Stanford University alumni
University of Michigan faculty
University of Michigan Law School faculty
Fellows of the American Academy of Arts and Sciences
Stanford University faculty
Yale University faculty
Year of birth missing (living people)
Living people